Vimalachatra (27 June 1921 – 5 December 2009), was a Princess of Thailand and member of the Thai Royal Family, a granddaughter of King Chulalongkorn. She was one of the longest-living royal personages in Thailand.

Biography
Princess Vimalachatra was born on 27 June 1921, in Bangkok, Thailand. She is the second daughter and youngest child of Prince Purachatra Jayakara, the Prince of Kamphaengphet (son of Chulalongkorn and Chao Chom Manda Wad). Her mother is Princess Prabhavasidhi Narumala of Siam (daughter of Prince Chaturanta Rasmi, the Prince Chakrabadibongse and Mom Rajawongse Savang Siriwongse. She is the direct granddaughter of King Chulalongkorn and also the great-granddaughter of Mongkut. She has 2 siblings; 1 elder sisters, and 1 elder brother:

 Princess Mayurachatra (7 March 1906 – 11 August 1970), married Prince Sohbhana Bharadaya Savastivatana, has issue
 Prince Prem Purachatra (12 August 1915 – 24 July 1981), married Ngamchit Sarasas, no issue

Marriage
Princess Vimalachatra married Prince Udaya Chalermlabh Vudhijaya, son of Prince Vudhijaya Chalermlabha, the Prince Singhavikrom Kriangkrai on 1 May 1939. The couple have a son and a daughter;

 Mom Rajawongse Chalermchatra Vudhijaya (born 16 June 1942) married Aim-orn Busbonk, has a son and a daughter
 Mom Luang Apichit Vudhijaya (born 15 July 1969)
 Mom Luang Atitra Vudhijaya (born 17 September 1972)
 Mom Rajawongse Phromchatra Vudhijaya (born 2 April 1948) married Mom Rajawongse Jisnusan Savastivatana, has 2 daughters
 Mom Luang Sasibha Savastivatana (born 17 April 1975)
 Mom Luang Chandrabha Savastivatana (born 20 May 1978)

Princess Vimalachatra performs many royal functions and many social duties on behalf of the King and Queen. She is the president of King Rama IX Park Foundation. She has shown keen interest in public affairs and education of the poor around the country.

She died in the early of 5 December 2009, at Praram 9 Hospital, Bangkok from renal failure. She died on King Bhumibol Adulyadej's 82nd birthday, before the royal birthday ceremony at the Grand Palace; seven days of Royal funeral were held at Wat Debsirin.

Royal decorations
  Dame Cross of the Most Illustrious Order of Chula Chom Klao
  Dame Grand Cordon of the Most Exalted Order of the White Elephant
  Dame Grand Cordon of the Most Noble Order of the Crown of Thailand
  King Rama IX the Great Royal Cypher Medal (2nd Class)

Honorary degrees
 1993: Honorary Doctor of Fine and Applied Arts, Rajamangala University of Technology
 1997: Honorary Doctor of Arts, Siam University
 1999: Honorary Doctor of Arts, Suan Sunandha Rajabhat University

Ancestors

References
 Mom Rajawongse Biradej Anubongs Chakrabandhu, 150th Anniversary, Prince Chaturanta Rasmi, the Prince Chakrabadibongse, Ministry of Finance, Bangkok, 2005.

External links
 http://freepages.genealogy.rootsweb.ancestry.com/~royalty/thailand/persons.html
 Royal command - giving the royal decoration of the Most Illustrious Order of Chula Chom Klao - 5 May 1987
 HH Princess Vimolchatra dies - Kom Chad Luek (Thai)
 Princess Vimolchatra dies in the morning of the King's birthday - Daily News (Thai)

1921 births
2009 deaths
Thai female Phra Ong Chao
Chatrajaya family
Vudhijaya family
Deaths from kidney failure
Dames Grand Commander of the Order of Chula Chom Klao
20th-century Chakri dynasty
21st-century Chakri dynasty